Sergeja Stefanišin (born 19 September 1974) is a Slovenian handball player for RK Krim and the Slovenian national team.

She participated at the 2016 European Women's Handball Championship.

References

1974 births
Living people
Slovenian female handball players
Handball players from Ljubljana
Expatriate handball players
Slovenian expatriate sportspeople in Croatia
RK Podravka Koprivnica players